Who's Your Caddy? is a 2007 American comedy film directed by Don Michael Paul and starring Big Boi, Lil Wayne, Andy Milonakis, Faizon Love, Terry Crews, Tony Cox, Jeffrey Jones and Jesper Parnevik. It is the first film produced by Robert L. Johnson's Our Stories Films studio.

The film was released on July 27, 2007, in the United States to universally negative reviews and commercial failure. It was released on DVD on November 27, 2007.

Plot

When hip-hop star Christopher "C-Note" Hawkins (Big Boi) is denied membership into an exclusive Carolina Pines Country Club, he comes up with a cunning plan that will oblige the country club to allow his acceptance. C-Note purchases property that contains land from the 17th hole and bribes the country club for a membership in exchange for his land. The rest of the movie's plot revolves around the club members and their efforts to get C-Note kicked out, while he disrupts the club's atmosphere.

Cast
 Big Boi as Christopher "C-Note" Hawkins (credited as "Antwan André Patton")
 Chase A.A. Jackson  as Young Christopher "C-Note" Hawkins
 David Kelly as Bobby Hawkins  
 James Avery as Mack "Caddy Mack"
 Bruce Bruce as Eddie "Golf-Ball Eddie"
 Tony Cox as Willie "Big Willie" Johnson
 Terry Crews as "Tank"
 Faizon Love as "Big Large"
 Finesse Mitchell as "Dread"
 Jeffrey Jones as Cummings
 Jesper Parnevik as himself
 Andy Milonakis as Wilson Cummings
 Sherri Shepherd as "Lady G"
 Tamala Jones as Shannon Williams
 Jenifer Lewis as Mrs. Hawkins
 Garrett Morris as Reverend J.J. Jackson
 Cam Gigandet as Mick
 Chase Tatum as "Kidd Clean"
 Susan Ward as Mrs. Cummings
 Hugh Jass as Bobby Lee
 Lawrence Hilton-Jacobs as Joseph Williams
 Robert Curtis Brown as "Frosty"
 Todd Sherry  as Realtor
 Matthew Reichel as himself
 Lil Wayne as himself

Production
The film was produced by Rifkin-Eberts and released by Dimension Films in association with Black Entertainment Television’s Robert L. Johnson.

Reception
Upon its release, Who's Your Caddy? was panned by critics. On Rotten Tomatoes, the film has an approval rating of 6% based on 34 reviews with the consensus stating: "A juvenile, uninspired retread of Caddyshack, Who's Your Caddy? is unoriginal, unfunny, and just plain forgettable." On Metacritic, the film has a score of 18 out of 100, based on reviews from 19 critics, indicating "Overwhelming dislike". 

The film was nominated for a Golden Raspberry award for Worst Remake or Rip-off, but lost to I Know Who Killed Me.

Former U.S. president Bill Clinton "loves" the film. In August 2016, Bradley Cooper and Todd Phillips made guest appearances on The Late Late Show with James Corden where they discussed having dinner with Clinton in Thailand while filming The Hangover Part II. The two guests stated that during their dinner with the former president, Clinton stated that he loves comedies and his favorite comedy is Who's Your Caddy?

Box office
The movie grossed US$2.76 million in its first week at the box office, debuting in the number 10 spot and performed poorly at the box office earning only $5,713,425 in total.

References

External links
 
 
 
 

2007 comedy films
2007 films
African-American comedy films
Golf films
Dimension Films films
Metro-Goldwyn-Mayer films
The Weinstein Company films
2000s sports comedy films
Films directed by Don Michael Paul
2000s English-language films
2000s American films